Sportsklubben Brann is a Norwegian professional football club based in Bergen. Founded on 26 September 1908, Brann has been in the Eliteserien, Norway's premier division of football, since 1987, except in 2015 and 2022, when they played in the 1. divisjon. They play their home matches at Brann Stadion where they had a record-breaking average attendance of 17,310 in the 2007 season, the season in which they won their first league title since 1963.

Overview 
As the biggest club in Norway's second-largest city Bergen, Brann is historically one of the major clubs in Norway in terms of public interest, and hence there are high expectations for the club every season. Brann won their first Norwegian top flight titles in 1961–62 and 1963, but after this Brann was involved in the race for the league title only in seasons 1974–76, 1990 and 2006. In 2007, they reclaimed the league title and thus ended a 44-year-long waiting period.

Despite the limited success, the club has never failed to spark considerable interest from the Norwegian media and keeping an epidemic of football hysteria continuously running in Bergen. Moreover, Brann have regularly been winners and runners-up of the Norwegian Cup. The club reached the quarter-finals of the Cup Winners' Cup in the 1996–97 season.

Formation and early years 
On 26 September 1908 Christen K. Gran and Birger Gjestland together with eight other men, met in a local café in Bergen. Due to dissatisfaction of the current state of the local football clubs in Bergen, they decided to form a new football club. They called it Ski- og Fodboldklubben Brann (Ski and Football Club Brann). This was later changed to Sportsklubben Brann (Sport Club Brann).

Brann played their first match against a local Bergen team on New Year's Day 1909, drawing 1–1. During the first years, Brann struggled with poor results. Then in 1917,considered the breakthrough year for Brann, they managed to qualify for the cup final. Brann lost the match 1–4 against Sarpsborg, but was now among the top teams of Norway. In 1917 the club bought an area south of the city of Bergen. Two years later on 25 May, with funding contributed by fans and investors, Brann Stadion was opened. The opening match was against the Norwegian national team, losing 2–6. In 1923 Brann won their first title when they defeated Lyn 2–1 in the Cup final. Two years later Brann claimed their second title this time defeating Sarpsborg 3–0 in the cup final.

The following years Brann entered a recession. Brann had to wait until 1947 before again qualifying for the top league that was now called Norgesligaen (Norwegian league). In 1950 Brann once again managed to qualify for the cup final, losing 0–3 to Fredrikstad.

1960s and 1970s: Glory and relegation 
In the 1960s Brann produced two of Norway's most profiled players. With Roald Jensen and Rolf Birger Pedersen on the team, Brann won their first League Championship in 1961–62 and in the consecutive season in 1963. During the 1963 season, Brann had an average attendance at 15,486, which was the league record until 2003, when Rosenborg did better.

In 1964, Brann were among the favorites to win their third consecutive league championship, but due to many injured players the team only won one of the first nine league games. In the second half of the season, Brann was positioned in the relegation zone and the team's star, Roald Jensen had departed to the Scottish team Hearts. Before the decisive match of the season, Brann was one point behind Viking on the last spot which was clear of relegation, and Brann were facing the already relegated Raufoss at home. Even though Brann had the greatest chances to score a goal, Raufoss won the match 1–0, and Brann surprisingly was relegated from the top league along with Raufoss.

Brann were promoted back into the top league in 1967, and Brann won the Cup Championship two times in the 1970s. Once in 1972 defeating Rosenborg 1–0. And again in 1976 defeating Sogndal 2–1. In each of the seasons 1974–1976, Brann narrowly missed out on the league title, attracting an average attendance that was unheard of in Norway at the time.

1980s: The "yo-yo" years 
With the 1980s came Brann's "yo-yo" era. Brann were relegated in 1979 and won the 2nd division in 1980, and the team continued to alternate between the 1st and 2nd division until they finally avoided relegation in 1987. This was a world record for consecutive relegations-promotions involving a top tier division. Brann remained in the top flight until it was relegated at the end of the 2014 season. In 1982, Brann again won the Cup Championship, beating Molde 3–2. Neil MacLeod scored the winning goal in the 57th minute.

Brann hadn't had any real challenge from local rivals at least since the 1950s. In 1989, however, the Bergen-based Fyllingen IL were promoted to the first tier for the first time.

1990s: Derbies, medals and brief European success 
Unlike for example the English Premier League, the top three teams of the Eliteserien are awarded medals. Silver and bronze medals are sometimes received with a shrug, but Brann's dismal league history made them top priority for the club in the 1990s. In 1990, Brann were involved in a decisive last match where they had the chance of clinching the league title, but lost and ended fourth. They lost out on their first medals since 1976 as local rivals Fyllingen IL conceded two vital goals against Molde FK in stoppage time. Only weeks prior to this, Fyllingen IL had beaten Brann in the Cup semi-finals, and their outspoken ambitions to take over the football hegemony in Bergen by now had become a major annoyance for Brann.

In 1991, after a shock resignation of manager Teitur Thordarson, Brann once again struggled, and needed a win in their last game against Strømsgodset in order save play-off against two first division teams. Losing the game would send Brann down, while securing play-off for equally struggling local rivals Fyllingen IL. Also, there were fears that a relegation would spawn another long-term "elevator era". A panic-stricken crowd saw Brann win the game 2–0. In the play-offs, though beating Strindheim IL at home, Brann still needed to beat Bryne F.K. away in a deciding match. A goal by Sten Glenn Håberg gave Brann a 1–0 win over Bryne, however, in a dramatic match where former Brann manager Mons Ivar Mjelde, then at the opposition side, hit the post.

Fyllingen IL were promoted back into the top division in 1992. In 1993 Brann got their two first-ever wins against their local rivals. A 6–1 thrashing in the penultimate league round sent Fyllingen down, while securing continued top division status for Brann. After the season, Brann purchased Fyllingen's key player Per-Ove Ludvigsen, and this put an end to Fyllingen and the derby matches. Fyllingen are now a mediocre fourth division side without top flight ambitions.

Brann were notorious for lacking a regular goal scorer ever since the 1970s, but this ended with Trond Egil Soltvedt's many goals in 1993 and 1994. His extremely dedicated style, his innocent and somewhat naïve personality and the fact that many of his goals were scored as a midfielder made him immensely popular. Just before the start of the 1995 season, however, he was sacked by Brann's board for "disloyalty", the board refusing to elaborate on this. Disciplinary action was also taken against stars Frank Strandli, Inge Ludvigsen and Claus Lundekvam. This caused a public outcry, the issue was all over the national media, there were demonstrations in the centre of Bergen, and the fans were split in their support to Soltvedt or to the board and manager Hallvar Thoresen. Attendances and the atmosphere on Brann Stadion initially plummeted as a result of this. The team spirit amongst players also seemed broken, and the first game against Molde F.K. was lost 6-0 at home, resulting in the entire crowd yelling for the board to resign. With Brann at bottom position halfway through the league season, Hallvar Thoresen was sacked and Kjell Tennfjord, the manager behind Fyllingen IL's success, was appointed. He saved Brann into an eventual mid-table position and led them to the Norwegian cup finals, again sparking immense optimism around the club.

In 1996, as in 1990, Brann were denied bronze medals in injury time of the last game, after a terrible blunder by keeper Birkir Kristinsson. Only days later, however, Brann beat PSV Eindhoven of the Netherlands to advance to the quarter-finals of the Cup Winners' Cup, ironically thanks to world-class goalkeeping by the same Birkir Kristinsson. This was the second time a Norwegian team had qualified for the last eight in Europe. In the quarter-finals, Brann first drew 1–1 at home against Liverpool F.C., before losing the away match 3–0 and thus being knocked out.

In 1997, Brann finally won league silver medals after a solitary last-match again from former manager Mons Ivar Mjelde. Later, Brann have also won league medals after finishing second in the 2000 and 2006 season and third in 1999 and 2004.

In 1998, as in 1995, Brann found themselves at the bottom of the table halfway through the season. The manager Kjell Tennfjord was replaced by Harald Aabrekk, and a host of quality players were purchased. This saved Brann from relegation, but combined with the construction of a new stand on Brann Stadion it gave them grave financial problems that only recently were resolved.

2000s: First title in decades 

Teitur Thordarson was named new manager in 2000 after the departure of Harald Aabrekk. For the second time in four seasons, Brann became runners-up, secured after defeating Molde 4–0 in the last game of the season. Thorstein Helstad became the league's top goalscorer in 2000 and 2001.

The 2002 season was the worst season for Brann in twelve seasons. They finished third from the bottom and had to face Sandefjord in a play-off to stay in the Tippeligaen. Brann narrowly avoided relegation thanks to a 2–1 home win after the first leg had ended with a 0–0 draw.

A third-place finish in the 2004 season saw Brann qualify for the Scandinavian Royal League.

In their impatient but unfruitful struggle to reclaim the glory of the 1960s, Brann over the years gained a reputation for inept leadership, unfounded enthusiasm or optimism and almost continuous internal unrest, deservedly or not. Since Mons Ivar Mjelde took over as manager in 2003, however, this image has changed, as the leadership has embraced continuity and extremely down-to-earth principles. Brann were now considered one of the best-run and harmonic clubs in Norway.

Being one of the biggest clubs in Norway in terms of public interest, it is generally agreed that Brann have underperformed compared to their potential at least since the mid-1970s. However, on 7 November 2004, Brann won their first title in 22 years, defeating Oslo side Lyn 4–1 in the Norwegian Cup. Bengt Sæternes scored a hat-trick within the first 35 minutes, becoming man of the match.

For most of the 2006 season Brann were top of the league and by many considered to be favourites to win the title. However, a poor run of form after the summer break, coupled with a correspondingly good run of form from arch-rivals Rosenborg meant that Brann hopefuls were disappointed.

Brann won the league in 2007, finishing six points ahead of Stabæk. The team did cause a small sensation, and bitter disappointment among tens of thousands of Brann-supporters who had gathered in Bergen to watch the game live, on 20 October by losing to Aalesund 1–2 in the 24th of 26 rounds, a match where a draw would have set aside all doubt about Brann's league win. However two days later, Viking defeated Brann's last rival to the gold medals Stabæk with a 2-1 result, thereby securing Brann the first league championship since 1963 anyway. The same season Brann also qualified for the group stage of the UEFA Cup, and advanced from the group with a win and a draw. Brann faced a tough test against Everton F.C. with the aggregated score an 8-1 loss after two games.

The 2008 season was a major disappointment for all the fans hoping to repeat the success of the 2007 season. In the league Brann finished eighth (of 14 teams) and in the national cup they reached the final 16 but was eliminated after an 8–0 loss away to Molde FK. Brann also participated in the UEFA Champions League qualifier, but was eliminated from the contest in the third qualifying round after losing both matches (home 0–1, away 1–2) against Olympique de Marseille from France. After this they played against the Spanish team Deportivo de La Coruña in the first round of the 2008–2009 edition of UEFA Cup but was eliminated on penalties after an aggregate result of 2–2. On 7 October 2008 Brann and their head coach Mons Ivar Mjelde announced that he would resign from the club at the end of the season.

Steinar Nilsen took over the team, and Brann finished fifth in the 2009 league.

2010s: Rebuilding, relegation and promotion

The 2010 season was a poor season for Brann. On 19 May the team surprisingly was knocked out of the cup after losing 0–1 to the 3rd division (fourth tier) team Fyllingen. The head coach Steinar Nilsen resigned two days later, and was replaced by Rune Skarsfjord. In the 2010 league, Brann finished in 13th place, thus securing the last spot that avoided relegation or relegation play-offs.

Expectations for Brann were low ahead of the 2011 season, with VG predicting that Brann would be relegated. Nonetheless, Brann opened the season strongly with victories over reigning league champion Rosenborg and Lillestrøm in the first and second rounds. Although the season did not continue as strongly as that, Brann remained a contender for a top three position in the league and the team also qualified to the 2011 Norwegian Football Cup Final by defeating Fredrikstad in the semi-final. Hopes for a medal were dashed however, when Brann first lost the cup final 1-2 against Aalesund, and then the last match of the league, also against Aalesund. Finally, Brann finished in fourth place.

On 28 July 2012, following his previous football team, Portsmouth going into administration, Huseklepp returned to Brann.

On 3 December 2013 Swedish manager Rikard Norling signed a contract with Brann lasting until the end of the 2016 season, after the club decided not to renew their contract with former manager Rune Skarsfjord. With him, he brought optimism to the club as Norling had recently won the league gold with Malmø FF in Sweden. The 2014 season ended disastrously, however, with relegation for the first time in 29 years. Brann had a difficult year throughout and was on a direct relegation spot for most of the season. A crucial win over Sogndal in the penultimate round lifted them to 14th place (third to last, qualification spot), and a last round win over Haugesund ensured it, allowing Brann a chance of salvaging a berth in next year's Tippeligaen through a qualifying match against the challenger Mjøndalen IF who had finished third in Adeccoligaen. However Brann lost the qualifier after the first leg at home in Bergen on 23 November ended in a 1–1 draw, while the second leg away ended in a 3–0 victory for Mjøndalen. This result meant that Mjøndalen was promoted to the Tippeligaen at the expense of Brann who faced relegation. The following season the team continued to struggle, and after immense pressure from fans, Norling was sacked on 27 May 2015.

Two days later, Lars Arne Nilsen was hired as interim manager, and for the rest of the season, Brann performed well, eventually ending on second place and ensuring promotion with two rounds left of the season. The day after the season ended, on 2 November 2015, Nilsen was given a three-year contract.

Achievements 
Eliteserien:
Winners (3): 1961–62, 1963, 2007
Runners-up (6): 1951–52, 1975, 1997, 2000, 2006, 2016
Norwegian First Division:
Winners (1): 2022
Runners-up (1): 2015
Norwegian Cup:
Winners (6): 1923, 1925, 1972, 1976, 1982, 2004
Runners-up (9): 1917, 1918, 1950, 1978, 1987, 1988, 1995 1999, 2011
UEFA Cup Winners' Cup:
Quarter-finals: 1996–97
UEFA Cup:
Round of 32: 2007–08

Recent history 
{|class="wikitable"
|-bgcolor="#efefef"
! Season
! 
! Pos.
! Pl.
! W
! D
! L
! GS
! GA
! P
!Cup
!colspan=2|Europe
!Notes
|-
|2005
|Tippeligaen
|align=right |6
|align=right|26||align=right|10||align=right|7||align=right|9
|align=right|43||align=right|32||align=right|37
||Quarterfinal
||UC|||First round
|
|-
|2006
|Tippeligaen
|align=right bgcolor=silver|2
|align=right|26||align=right|14||align=right|4||align=right|8
|align=right|39||align=right|36||align=right|46
||Fourth round
||UC|||Second qualification round
|Fair play
|-
|2007
|Tippeligaen
|align=right bgcolor=gold|1
|align=right|26||align=right|17||align=right|3||align=right|6
|align=right|59||align=right|39||align=right|54
||Fourth round
||UC|||Last 32
|
|-
|2008
|Tippeligaen
|align=right |8
|align=right|26||align=right|8||align=right|9||align=right|9
|align=right|36||align=right|36||align=right|33
||Fourth round|||CL  UC
||Third qualification round  First round
||
|-
|2009
|Tippeligaen
|align=right |5
|align=right|30||align=right|12||align=right|8||align=right|10
|align=right|51||align=right|49||align=right|44
||Quarterfinal
|
|
||
|-
|2010
|Tippeligaen
|align=right |13
|align=right|30||align=right|8||align=right|10||align=right|12
|align=right|48||align=right|50||align=right|34
||Second round
|
||
|
|-
|2011
|Tippeligaen
|align=right |4
|align=right|30||align=right|14||align=right|6||align=right|10
|align=right|51||align=right|49||align=right|48
|bgcolor=silver|Final
|
||
|
|-
|2012
|Tippeligaen
|align=right |6
|align=right|30||align=right|13||align=right|3||align=right|14
|align=right|57||align=right|50||align=right|42
|Semifinal
|
||
|
|-
|2013
|Tippeligaen
|align=right |8
|align=right|30||align=right|11||align=right|6||align=right|13
|align=right|46||align=right|46||align=right|39
||Third round
|
||
|
|-
|2014
|Tippeligaen
|align=right bgcolor="#FFCCCC"| 14
|align=right|30||align=right|8||align=right|5||align=right|17
|align=right|41||align=right|54||align=right|29
||Quarterfinal
|
||
|Relegated to the 1. divisjon 
|-
|2015
|1. divisjon 
|align=right bgcolor=#DDFFDD| 2
|align=right|30||align=right|14||align=right|11||align=right|5
|align=right|46||align=right|35||align=right|53
||Fourth round
|
||
|Promoted to Tippeligaen 
|-
|2016
|Tippeligaen
|align=right bgcolor=silver|2
|align=right|30||align=right|16||align=right|6||align=right|8
|align=right|42||align=right|27||align=right|54
||First round
|
|
|
|-
|2017
|Eliteserien
|align=right |5
|align=right|30||align=right|13||align=right|8||align=right|9
|align=right|51||align=right|36||align=right|47
||Fourth round
|EL
|Second qualification round
|
|-
|2018
|Eliteserien
|align=right bgcolor=cc9966|3
|align=right|30||align=right|17||align=right|7||align=right|6
|align=right|45||align=right|31||align=right|58
||Fourth round
|
||
|
|-
|2019 
|Eliteserien
|align=right |9
|align=right|30||align=right|10||align=right|10||align=right|10
|align=right|32||align=right|37||align=right|40
||Fourth round
|EL
|First qualification round
|
|-
|2020 
|Eliteserien
|align=right |10
|align=right|30||align=right|9||align=right|9||align=right|12
|align=right|40||align=right|49||align=right|36
||Cancelled
|
||
|
|-
|2021 
|Eliteserien
|align=right bgcolor="#FFCCCC"| 14
|align=right|30||align=right|5||align=right|11||align=right|14
|align=right|38||align=right|55||align=right|26
||Fourth round
|
||
|Relegated to the 1. divisjon
|-
|2022
|1. divisjon 
|align=right bgcolor=#DDFFDD| 1
|align=right|30||align=right|26||align=right|3||align=right|1
|align=right|95||align=right|16||align=right|81
||
|
||
|Promoted to Eliteserien
|}

 CL: UEFA Champions League
 UC: UEFA Cup
 EL: UEFA Europa League

Source:

Brann in Europe
Brann's first competitive European match was a 2-0 victory (9-0 on aggregate) over Gzira United in the 1973-74 European Cup Winners' Cup. The club's most successful European efforts came at the 1996-97 UEFA Cup Winners' Cup when the club advanced to the quarterfinals, and the 2007-08 UEFA Cup, with the club advancing to the Round of 32.

UEFA club coefficient ranking
As of 8 Septembar 2022, Source:

Players and staff

Current squad

For season transfers, see transfers winter 2021–22 and transfers summer 2022.

Out on loan

First team staff

Administrative staff

Player of the year 

2000:  Roy Wassberg
2001:  Raymond Kvisvik
2002:  Tommy Knarvik
2003:  Raymond Kvisvik
2004:  Ragnvald Soma
2005:  Paul Scharner
2006:  Håkon Opdal
2007:  Thorstein Helstad
2008:  Olafur Örn Bjarnason
2009:  Erik Huseklepp
2010:  Petter Vaagan Moen
2011:  Rodolph Austin
2012:  Piotr Leciejewski
2013:  Piotr Leciejewski
2014:  Stéphane Badji
2015:  Vadim Demidov
2016:  Vadim Demidov
2017:  Vito Wormgoor
2018:  Fredrik Haugen
2019:  Petter Strand
2020:  Ole Martin Kolskogen

Coaches 

 Karl Geyer (1938–39)
 Billy Cook (1947)
 Alf Young (1948)
 Billy Cook (1949–51)
 George Ainsley (1955)
 Oddvar Hansen (1955–57), (1960–63)
 Josef Stroh (1 January 1964 – 31 December 1964)
 Oddvar Hansen (1965–68)
 Karol Bučko (1969–72)
 Billy Elliott (1974–78)
 Les Shannon (1 January 1980 – 31 December 1981)
 Arve Mokkelbost (1982–83)
 Tony Knapp (1 January 1986 – 31 December 1987)
 Teitur Thordarson (1 January 1988 – 31 December 1990)
 Kalle Björklund (1 January 1991 – 31 December 1992)
 Hallvar Thoresen (1 January 1993 – 25 June 1995)
 Kjell Tennfjord (25 June 1995 – 5 July 1998)
 Harald Aabrekk (9 July 1998 – 31 December 1999)
 Teitur Thordarson (1 January 2000 – 31 December 2002)
 Mons Ivar Mjelde (1 January 2003 – 31 December 2008)
 Steinar Nilsen (1 January 2009 – 21 May 2010)
 Rune Skarsfjord, interim (22 May 2010 – 31 December 2010)
 Rune Skarsfjord (1 January 2011 – 6 November 2013)
 Kenneth Mikkelsen, interim (6 November 2013 – 31 December 2013)
 Rikard Norling (1 January 2014 – 27 May 2015)
 Lars Arne Nilsen (29 May 2015 – 3 August 2020)
 Kåre Ingebrigtsen (8 August 2020 – 19 July 2021)
 Eirik Horneland, interim (20 July 2021 – 19 November 2021)
 Eirik Horneland (19 November 2021 – )

References

External links 

 http://www.brann.no Brann official club pages

 
Association football clubs established in 1908
1908 establishments in Norway
Defunct athletics clubs in Norway
Eliteserien clubs
Sport in Bergen